The 2016–17 First Professional Football League is the 93rd season of the top division of the Bulgarian football league system, the 69th since a league format was adopted for the national competition of A Group as a top tier of the pyramid and also the inaugural season of the First Professional Football League, which decides the Bulgarian champion. The season is the first with a new league structure and strict financial criteria where 14 clubs play each other home and away, until the league is split up in championship and relegation playoffs. The new league structure, inspired by the ones used by the Belgian First Division A and Danish Superliga, was approved by the Bulgarian Football Union on 6 June 2016. The fixtures were announced on 8 July 2016.

On 5 May 2017, five rounds before the end of the championship, after winning the away match with Lokomotiv Plovdiv, Ludogorets Razgrad managed to secure the title for a sixth consecutive and overall time. Ludogorets finished 16 points ahead of CSKA Sofia. Levski Sofia finished third.

Competition format
Starting from the 2016–17 season, a new league format was approved by the Bulgarian Football Union, in an attempt to improve each participating club's competitiveness, match attendance and performance in the league, alongside strict financial criteria. It involves 14 teams playing in two phases, a regular season and playoffs. The first phase includes each club competing against every other team twice in a double round-robin system, on a home-away basis at a total of 26 games per team, also played in 26 fixtures. Seven matches are played in every fixture at a total of 182 games during the first phase. In the second phase, the top six teams form a European qualifying table, while the bottom eight teams participate in a relegation group. The winner of the top group is declared as Champions of Bulgaria and is awarded with the title.

International qualification
The six top teams compete against each other on a home-away basis. Three matches are played in every fixture of the top six, with the results and points after the regular season also included. At the end of the stage, every team will have played a total of 36 games. The winner of the group is declared as Champions of Bulgaria and automatically secures participation in the 2017-18 UEFA Champions League second qualifying round. The team that ranks second is awarded with a place in the UEFA Europa League qualifying rounds. The third team in the final standings would participate in a play-off match against a representative team from the bottom eight. Depending on the winner of the Bulgarian Cup final, a possible fourth team from the first six may compete in a play-off match for an UEFA Europa League spot instead of the third ranked team.

Note: If the Bulgarian Cup winner has secured its qualification for the European tournaments for the next season through results from Parva Liga, then the place in the UEFA Europa League play-off is awarded to the fourth ranked team in the final standings.

Relegation
The teams in the bottom eight are split in two sub-groups of four teams, Group A and Group B, depending on their final position after the regular season standings. The teams that enter Group A are the 7th, 10th, 11th and the 14th, and the teams that participate in Group B are the 8th, 9th, 12th and the 13th. Every participant plays twice against the other three teams in their group on a home-away basis. The teams from the bottom eight also compete with the results from the regular season. After the group stages, every team will have played a total number of 32 games. Depending on their final position in Group A and Group B, two sections will be formed, one for a play-off spot in next season's European competitions and one to avoid relegation. The first two teams from each group continue in the semi-finals, and the last two teams of each group continue to the semi-finals for a relegation match. After this phase, one team is directly relegated to the Second League and the remaining two teams will compete in two relegation matches against the second and the third ranked clubs from the Second League.

Tiebreakers
In case of a tie on points between two or more clubs, tiebreakers are applied in the following order:

Number of wins;
Goal difference;
Goals pro;
Goals away;
Fewer red cards;
Fewest yellow cards;
Draw

Teams
Prior to the start of the season, the Bulgarian Football Union announced that every Bulgarian professional football club's application would be considered for the upcoming season, as long as it fulfills the financial criteria. A total of 14 teams would be contesting the league, including the 9 sides from the previous season, plus five promoted clubs from the lower B Group, which would be issued a license by the Bulgarian Football Union. The five approved applications from the lower division were the B Group's last year champions Dunav Ruse, alongside Lokomotiv GO, Neftochimic, Vereya and CSKA Sofia respectively.

Dunav return after a 25-year absence from the top flight, Lokomotiv Gorna Oryahovitsa return after a 21-year absence, Neftochimic return after a two-year absence, Vereya made its debut in the top flight, while CSKA Sofia return after a one-year absence, having played in the third tier the previous season, but managing to administratively promote back to the elite.

Stadia and locations

Note: From the 2016–17 season onwards, all participating clubs are required to have electric floodlights and adequate pitch conditions under the BFU and TV broadcaster's new licensing criteria.  The following stadiums below have either obtained a license under UEFA's category ranking or fulfill the licensing criteria.

Note: On June 15, 2016, the Ministry of Youth and Sports of Bulgaria granted 3 mln. BGN in total for stadium renovations to the following three clubs – Cherno More, Dunav and Lokomotiv GO.

Personnel and sponsorship
Note: Flags indicate national team as has been defined under FIFA eligibility rules. Players and managers may hold more than one non-FIFA nationality.

Note: Individual clubs may wear jerseys with advertising. However, only one sponsorship is permitted per jersey for official tournaments organised by UEFA in addition to that of the kit manufacturer (exceptions are made for non-profit organisations).
Clubs in the domestic league can have more than one sponsorship per jersey which can feature on the front of the shirt, incorporated with the main sponsor or in place of it; or on the back, either below the squad number or on the collar area. Shorts also have space available for advertisement.

Managerial changes

a.Initially interim, made permanent 19 January 2017.
b.Initially interim, made permanent 16 December 2016.
c.Initially interim, made permanent 16 November 2016.
d.Initially interim, made permanent 3 January 2017.

Regular season

League table

Results

Positions by round

Results by round

Championship round
Points and goals will carry over in full from regular season.

Positions by round
Below the positions per round are shown. As teams did not all start with an equal number of points, the initial pre-playoffs positions are also given.

Relegation round
Points and goals will carry over in full from regular season.

Group A

Group B

European play-offs

Bracket

European play-off quarter-finals

European play-off semi-finals

Since Botev Plovdiv qualified for the Europa League first qualifying round by winning the 2016–17 Bulgarian Cup, the semi-finals were not held and Vereya qualified automatically for the play-off final.

European play-off final

Relegation play-offs

Bracket

Winners of matches 3, 5 and 6 will play in the top division next season

First round

Second round

Lokomotiv Gorna Oryahovitsa are relegated to the Second League.

Third round

Neftochimic and Montana are relegated to the Second League.

Season statistics

Scoring

Top scorers

Notes

Hat-tricks

Note
4 Player scored 4 goals

Clean sheets

Notes

Transfers
List of Bulgarian football transfers summer 2016
List of Bulgarian football transfers winter 2016–17

References

External links
First League (uefa.com)
bulgarian-football.com

2016-2017
Bul
1